The 2020 Yukon Men's Curling Championship, the territorial men's curling championship for Yukon was held from January 24 to 26 at the Whitehorse Curling Club in Whitehorse, Yukon. The winning Thomas Scoffin rink represented the Yukon at the 2020 Tim Hortons Brier in Kingston, Ontario and finished with a 0–7 record.

Teams
Three teams entered the event:

Draw
The event is a double round robin. If any team goes undefeated, they would be declared the champions. If no team goes undefeated, a playoff will occur between each of the three teams. If one team has three or more losses, then there will be a playoff with the top two teams (with the first place team needing to be beaten twice).

The first game of the event was scheduled for 9:00am on January 24, but was postponed to 7:00pm due to compressor issues.

Round-robin standings
As of Draw 4

The Thomas Scoffin Rink went 4-0 in the round robin and will represent Yukon at the 2020 Brier.

References

2020 Tim Hortons Brier
Men's Curling Championship, 2020
Sport in Whitehorse
Men's Curling Championship
January 2020 sports events in Canada